Social Democratic Party of the Netherlands was founded on March 14, 1909, as a breakaway from the Dutch Social Democratic Workers' Party.

In 1907 tensions arose within the Social Democratic Workers' Party (SDAP) between revolutionary Marxists grouped around De Tribune (The Tribune) and the leadership of the SDAP, who were more oriented towards more a revisionist ideology and a parliamentary and reformist political strategy. As Jan Ceton, Willem van Ravesteyn and David Wijnkoop and other participants in  De Tribune increasingly criticized the leadership of the SDAP.

At a party congress in Deventer held on February 14, 1909 the leadership of the SDAP demanded that they stop publishing De Tribune or be expelled from the party. Wijnkoop and Ceton refused and they and their supporters, including the poet Herman Gorter and the mathematician Gerrit Mannoury, left to form a breakaway party. This split was the first such split in Western European European Socialist parties, although others followed. There had already been a split between the Bolsheviks and Mensheviks in the Russian Social Democratic Labour Party and with the break away Tesnjaki group which broke from the Bulgarian Social Democratic Workers Party. On March 14, 1909 the dissenters founded a new party called the Social-Democratic Party (SDP). They had a membership of around 400 spread across different cities: Amsterdam (160), Rotterdam (65), The Hague (45), Leiden (56), Utrecht (25), Bussum (15).
In the 1910s the SDAP paid much attention to attacking the newly formed SDP. The mobilization for the First World War, which the SDAP supported and the SDP opposed, further strengthened the differences between the parties. In the 1917 elections the SDP was still unable to win any seats. In May 1918 the Left Wing founded the journal De Internationale, uniting four opposition groups within the SDP, with groups in Amsterdam, Rotterdam and The Hague plus the Zimmerwald Left Propaganda Union. This group did not favour the parliamentarianism of the majority.

In 1918 the party contested the July elections. In November became the Communist Party of the Netherlands.

References

Defunct socialist parties in the Netherlands
Political parties established in 1909
1909 establishments in the Netherlands
Political parties disestablished in 1918
1918 disestablishments in the Netherlands